Anamera is a genus of longhorn beetles of the subfamily Lamiinae, containing the following species:

 Anamera alboguttata Thomson, 1864
 Anamera concolor Lacordaire, 1869
 Anamera densemaculata Breuning, 1940
 Anamera fulvescens Gahan, 1893
 Anamera gigantea Breuning, 1935
 Anamera harmandi Pic, 1936
 Anamera obesa Pic, 1928
 Anamera similis Breuning, 1938
 Anamera strandi Breuning, 1935
 Anamera strandiella Breuning, 1944

References

Lamiini
Cerambycidae genera